William Davies (died 27 July 1593) was a Welsh Roman Catholic priest. He is a Catholic martyr, beatified in 1987. There is a chapel in Anglesey built as a memorial to him.

Life

Davies was born in North Wales, probably Croes yn Eirias, Denbighshire, but his date of birth is not known, however one source gives the year 1555. Groes yn Eirias (meaning Torch Cross) is the old name for the area of dwellings between Llanelian and Colwyn Bay, Groes Road Colwyn Bay is a route to Llanelian Church. Eirias Park is in the same area. (It is now in the County of Conwy.) He studied at Reims, where he arrived on 6 April 1582 just in time to assist at the first Mass of Nicholas Garlick. He received tonsure and minor orders on 23 September 1583, together with seventy-three English students. Ordained as a priest in April 1585, he worked as a missionary in Wales. With his patron Robert Pugh, he secretly produced the book Y Drych Christianogawl, said to be the first book printed in Wales. The press may have been located in a cave above the sea at the Little Orme head between Llandudno and Penrhyn Bay.

In March 1592, he was arrested at Holyhead, with four students whom he was sending via Ireland to the English College at Valladolid. Pugh escaped arrest.

He was imprisoned in a dungeon in Beaumaris Castle and separated from his companions, having confessed that he was a priest. After a month he was able to join the students for an hour in the day, and even to celebrate Mass. The jailor became lax, and they might have escaped had they so willed. Catholics from all parts came to consult him, and Protestant ministers came to dispute with him.

At the assizes he and his companions were condemned to death, on which Davies intoned the Te Deum, which the others took up. The judge reprieved the condemned till the Queen's pleasure be known.

Sent to Ludlow, to be examined by the Council of the Marches, Davies encountered more Protestant ministers. They took him to church under pretext of a disputation, and then began the Protestant service. He recited the Latin Vespers in a loud voice.

From Ludlow he was sent to Bewdley, where he had to share his prison with felons, and thence to other jails. He was sent back to Beaumaris, and rejoined his young companions. For some six months he lived with them the life of a religious community, dividing the time between prayer and study.

At the summer assizes it was decided that the priest must die as a traitor, though he was offered his life if he would go but once to church. In spite of local opposition, the sentence was carried out and he was hanged, drawn, and quartered at Beaumaris Castle.

Veneration
Blessed William Davies' feast is celebrated on 27 July. His cassock was preserved as a relic by his companions. They, though condemned to imprisonment for life, managed in time to escape. The youngest found his way to Valladolid, where he recounted the whole story to Bishop Yepes, who wrote it in his Historia particular de la Persecucion en Inglaterra. 

In 2010, during his papal visit to the UK, Pope Benedict XVI was presented with an exact facsimile of the book Y Drych Christianogawl, which had been commissioned by Joseph Kelly, Editor of The Universe Catholic weekly as a gift from the people of Wales. The facsimile was produced by renowned book conservator Julian Thomas at the National Library of Wales in Aberystwyth, using one of only two surviving copies of the original book.

Notes

References
Attribution
 The entry cites:
Richard Challoner, Missionary Priests (London, 1741);
Joseph Gillow, Bibl. Dict. Eng. Cath., II, s v.;
Douay Diaries (London, 1878);
Diego de Yepes, Hist. de la Persecucion en Inglaterra;
Bede Camm, In the Brave Days of Old (London, 1899).

1593 deaths
16th-century Welsh Roman Catholic priests
Welsh beatified people
People executed under Elizabeth I by hanging, drawing and quartering
16th-century venerated Christians
People executed under the Tudors for treason against England
Welsh Roman Catholic martyrs
Year of birth missing
Executed Welsh people
Martyred Roman Catholic priests
16th-century Roman Catholic martyrs
Eighty-five martyrs of England and Wales